Noverre (May 2, 1998 – 2012) was an American-bred, British-trained Thoroughbred racehorse and sire.

Background
Noverre was a bay horse bred by Darley Stud and raced by a sister operation, Godolphin Racing. He was sired by Rahy, out of the mare Danseur Fabuleux who was also the dam of 1991 European Horse of the Year, Arazi.

Noverre was trained at age two by David Loder.

Racing career
Noverre won two listed races in France and two Group 2 events in England. Sent to the United States, the colt finished eleventh on dirt in the 2000 Breeders' Cup Juvenile, hosted that year by Churchill Downs. At age three, Noverre's owners turned his race conditioning over to Saeed bin Suroor. For him, Noverre finished first in the 2001 Poule d'Essai des Poulains at Longchamp Racecourse in Paris but was subsequently disqualified after testing positive for the banned substance Methylprednisolone.  He went on to win the Group 1 Sussex Stakes at Goodwood Racecourse in Chichester, England. That year he also had second-place finishes in the UAE 2000 Guineas in Dubai and in England's St. James's Palace and Queen Elizabeth II Stakes.

Noverre returned to the track in 2002 for a four-year-old campaign. In top races, he notably earned runnerups in the Dubai Duty Free Stakes and in England's Lockinge and Sussex Stakes.

Stud record
Noverre was retired to stand at stud beginning in the 2003 season at his owner's Kildangan Stud in County Kildare, Ireland. In 2008, he was sold to breeders in India to stand at Sohna Stud Farm near Delhi, where he died in 2012. From his offspring, Noverre's best runner to date has been a 2006 colt named Le Havre who in 2009 won the Group 1 French Derby at Chantilly Racecourse.

Pedigree

References

1998 racehorse births
2012 racehorse deaths
Racehorses bred in Kentucky
Racehorses trained in the United Kingdom
Thoroughbred family 7